Robert K. Haas (May 25, 1906 – September 1979) was an American football player. He played college football at Worcester State and professional football in the National Football League (NFL) as a back for the Dayton Triangles. He appeared in five NFL games, three as a starter, during the 1929 season.

References

1906 births
1979 deaths
Dayton Triangles players
Players of American football from Ohio
Worcester State University alumni